Lewis Fitzgerald Bush (December 2, 1969 – December 8, 2011) was an American football linebacker in the National Football League.

High school career
Bush prepped at Washington High School in Tacoma, Washington.

College career
Bush played college football at Washington State University in Pullman, from 1988 through 1992.

Professional career
Bush was selected by the San Diego Chargers in the fourth round (99th overall) of the 1993 NFL Draft.
He played in the NFL for ten seasons, seven with the Chargers and three with the Kansas City Chiefs.

Post-career
Bush was a pre-game commentator for San Diego Chargers radio broadcasts on KIOZ, and also worked as an Enrollment Advisor for Ashford University in 2009.

Bush died of a heart attack at age 42 in late 2011.

References

External links

 

1969 births
2011 deaths
Place of death missing
American football linebackers
Washington State Cougars football players
San Diego Chargers players
Kansas City Chiefs players
National Football League announcers
Players of American football from Atlanta
Players of American football from Tacoma, Washington